Brown & Proud is the debut studio album by Latin hip hop group A Lighter Shade of Brown from Riverside, California. It was released in 1990 through Pump Records with distribution via Quality Records. Recording sessions took place at Paramount Recording Studios, Trax Recording Studio and Image Recorders in Hollywood, and at Beach Recording Studios in Redondo Beach. Production was handled by Fabe Love, Jammin' James Carter, D.J. Romeo, D.J. Battlecat and Tony G. It features guest appearances from Chulo, Huggy Boy, Teardrop, King Ed and Shiro.

The album peaked at #184 on the Billboard 200 and #8 on the Heatseekers Albums in the United States. It spawned three singles: "T.J. Nights", "Latin Active" and "On a Sunday Afternoon". The latter two made it to the Billboard charts, peaking at #59 and #39 respectively on the Hot 100.

Track listing

Samples
"Bouncin'"
"Think (About It)" by Lyn Collins
"More Bounce to the Ounce" by Zapp
"Boyz-N-The-Hood (Remix)" by Eazy-E
"On a Sunday Afternoon"
"Papa Was Too" by Joe Tex
"Groovin'" by The Young Rascals
"Crystal Blue Persuasion" by Tommy James and the Shondells
"Paquito Soul"
"Respect" by Aretha Franklin
"I Know You Got Soul" by Bobby Byrd
"Impeach the President" by The Honey Drippers
"Spill the Wine"
"Spill the Wine" by Eric Burdon & War
"T.J. Nights"
"One of These Nights" by Eagles
"Play That Funky Music" by Wild Cherry
"Latin Active"
"I Like What You're Doing to Me" by Young and Company
"Radio Activity" by Royal Cash

Personnel
Robert "ODM" Gutierrez – main artist, sleeve notes
Bobby "DTTX" Ramirez – main artist, sleeve notes
Chulo – featured artist (track 1)
King Ed – featured artist (track 7)
Huggy Boy – featured artist (track 8)
Teardrop – featured artist (track 10)
Shiro – featured artist (track 10)
The Hou Dog Houston – keyboards, guitar & bass (tracks: 1-6, 8-11), recording
Stan "The Guitar" Man – guitar & bass (track 7)
Fabian Alfaro – producer (tracks: 1-3, 6-7, 9-10)
James Calvin Carter – producer (tracks: 1, 4, 6-8, 10), executive producer
Dominic Aldridge – producer (tracks: 1-3, 9-10), executive producer
Kevin Gilliam – producer (track 5)
Antonio Gonzalez – additional producer (track 7), mixing (track 11)
Danny Clay Williams – recording
Geza Gedeon – recording
Brian Carey – recording
Jason Roberts – recording
Cliff Richey Jr. – executive producer, management
Gino Daniels – design
Ithaka Darin Pappas – photography*

Charts

References

External links

1990 debut albums
A Lighter Shade of Brown albums
Albums produced by Battlecat (producer)